Bissulfosuccinimidyl suberate (BS3) is a crosslinker used in biological research.  It is a water-soluble version of disuccinimidyl suberate.

Crosslinkers 
Crosslinkers are chemical reagents that play a crucial role in the preparation of conjugates used in biological research particularly immuno-technologies and protein studies. Crosslinkers are designed to covalently interact with molecules of interest, resulting in conjugation. A spacer arm, generally consisting of several atoms, separates the two molecules, and the nature and length of this spacer is important to consider when designing an assay involving the selected crosslinker. Bissulfosuccinimidyl suberate is an example of a homobifunctional crosslinker.

Characteristics 
Water-soluble: BS3 is hydrophilic due to its terminal sulfonyl substituents and as a result dissociates in water, eliminating the need to use organic solvents which interfere with protein structure and function.  Because organic solvents need not be used when BS3 is used as the crosslinker, it is ideal for investigations into protein structure and function in physiologic conditions.

Non-cleavable: The BS3 crosslinker has an 8-atom spacer is non-cleavable and the molecule is not cell membrane permeable.  BS3 binds irreversibly to its conjugate molecules, meaning that once BS3 creates covalent linkages to its target molecules, those associations are not easily broken. 

Membrane impermeable: Since BS3 is a charged molecule, it cannot freely pass through cellular membranes which makes it an ideal crosslinker for cell surface proteins. 

Homobifunctional: BS3 is a homobifunctional crosslinker in that it has two identical reactive groups, i.e. the N-hydroxysulfosuccinimide esters, and only one step is necessary to establish crosslinking between conjugate molecules. 

Amine reactive:  BS3 is amine-reactive in that its N-hydroxysulfosuccinimide (NHS) esters at each end react specifically with primary amines to form stable amide bonds in a nucleophilic acyl substitution-type reaction in which the N-hydroxysulfosuccinimide acts as the leaving group. BS3 is particularly useful in protein-related applications in that it can react with the primary amines on the side chain of lysine residues and the N-terminus of polypeptide chains.  This crosslinker can also be used to stabilize protein-protein interactions for further analysis by immunoprecipitation.

Deuterated BS3 
The deuterated crosslinker bis(sulfosuccinimidyl) 2,2,7,7-suberate-d4 is the "heavy" BS3 crosslinking agent that contains 4 deuterium atoms. When used in mass spectrometry studies, BS3-d4 provides a 4 dalton shift compared to crosslinked proteins with the non-deuterated analog (BS3-d0). Thus, "heavy" and "light" crosslinker analogs can be used for isotopically labeling protein and peptides in mass spectrometry research applications.

Applications 
 Cell-surface receptor-ligand studies
 Crosslinking biomolecules on cells
 Fixation of protein complexes prior to protein interaction analysis

Disuccinimidyl suberate 

Disuccinimidyl suberate (DSS) is the non-water-soluble analog of BS3. DSS and BS3 express the same crosslinking ability toward primary amines. The major structural difference between these two molecules is that DSS does not contain the sulfonate substituents at either end of the molecule, and it is this difference that is responsible for the uncharged, non-polar nature of the DSS molecule.  Due to the hydrophobic nature of this crosslinker it must be dissolved in an organic solvent such as dimethylsulfoxide before being added to an aqueous sample. Because of the ability of DSS to cross cell membranes, it is best suited for applications where intracellular crosslinking is needed.

References

Sulfonic acids
Succinimides